Binerah Downs is one of seven former cattle stations located within the Sturt National Park. There 

References

Localities in New South Wales
Far West (New South Wales)
Pastoral leases in New South Wales
Stations (Australian agriculture)